Hannon Hill is a bare rock hill,  high, on the west side of the terminus of Amos Glacier, at the juncture with Blue Glacier, in Victoria Land, Antarctica. 

It was named in 1992 by the Advisory Committee on Antarctic Names after Timothy J. Hannon, a cartographer with the United States Geological Survey (USGS). He was the leader of a two man USGS team working jointly out of Vanda Station with a New Zealand team in the 1988–89 season to establish new geodetic controls and observe old stations in the McMurdo Dry Valleys. He later relocated the position of the Geographic South Pole.

References

Hills of Victoria Land
Scott Coast